George is an American sitcom that aired from November 5, 1993, to January 19, 1994. Tony Danza was co-producer of the series.

Premise
George Foreman plays a retired boxer who runs an after-school program for troubled kids.

Cast
George Foreman as George Foster
Sheryl Lee Ralph as Maggie Foster
Tony T. Johnson as "Bubba" Foster
Lauren Robinson as "Vee" Foster
Lawrence Gilliard Jr. as Lathan Basmore
Anne Haney as Juanita
Pablo Irlando as Mauricio Butler
Cleandre Norman as Daniel Hickok
Doniell Spencer as Shasta

Episodes

References

External links

1993 American television series debuts
1994 American television series endings
1990s American sitcoms
1990s American black sitcoms
American Broadcasting Company original programming
English-language television shows
Television series by Sony Pictures Television
 Television shows set in Texas